Hannah Perry (born 1984) is a British artist working mainly in installation, sculpture, print and video. She blends personal references with popular culture to create videos, sounds, images and objects.

Biography 
Perry was born in Chester, England. She attended Goldsmiths, University of London receiving a BFA in Fine Art in 2009. She went on to complete an M.A. in Fine Art at The Royal Academy of Arts in 2014. She lives and works in London.

Career 
Perry's work is interdisciplinary, spanning video, installation, sculpture, painting, screen printing and performance. In 2011, she was first recognised for her video performance work on South London art collective LuckyPDF's TV project for Frieze Art Fair. In 2014, a performance work called Deja Vu! was presented at the Serpentine Galleries Park Nights, a performance collaboration where she brought together various creatives including composer Mica Levi and British poet Sam Riviere, whom she continues to work with. Her largest solo presentation of artwork was GUSH!, an exhibition at Somerset House, London in October 2018. This included a sound-sculpture installation and 360 degree video. Perry presented another performance artwork during the exhibition in collaboration with musicians from the London Contemporary Orchestra including Robert Ames and Oliver Coates and music producers Mica Levi and Coby Sey who played a live score soundtrack to the dance piece.

She has been part of various group exhibitions with artists such as Ed Atkins, Trisha Baga, Ed Fornieles, Shana Moulton, Takeshi Murata, Jon Rafman and Ryan Trecartin.

Perry's work My Pharmaceuticals featured in Channel 4 Random Acts Random Acts in partnership with Arts Council England in 2016.

Work 
Much of Perry's practice is centred around ideas of class and gender. Curator and critic Jonathan Griffin described Perry's works as "messy, emotive work that synthesizes snatches of material sourced online and from her daily life. She melds it all together in videos, which she typically displays on monitors attached to sculptural installations, often supported by steel scaffolding poles beside hanging curtains of fabric or vinyl." From sources such as psychotherapy papers, narrative writing, secretly recorded sessions with a therapist and her personal emails, Perry's video and installations explore several stereotypes generally associated with women, notably the stereotypes around female hysteria. She works with low-resolution images associated with femininity and hysteria, machismo and industrialism and juxtaposes them to trance music and materials such as latex, mirrors and hair.

References

Further reading 
 Thorne, Sam (13 April 2013) "In Focus: Hannah Perry" Frieze.
 
 
 Artsy Editors (17 February 2015) " Up and Coming: Mounting Her U.S. Debut, British Artist Hannah Perry Plays a Deconstructed Film to an L.A. Audience" Artsy.

External links
GUSH!

New media artists
British artists
1984 births
Living people
People from Chester